During the 7th century the region of Tunisia was conquered by Arab troops led by the Ghassanid general Hassan Ibn Numan. The city had the natural advantage of coastal access, via the Mediterranean, to the major ports of southern Europe. Early on, Tunis played a military role — the Arabs recognized the strategic importance of its proximity to the Strait of Sicily. From the earliest years of the 8th century, Tunis was the chef-lieu of this area: it became the Arabs' naval base in the western Mediterranean, and took on considerable military importance, and with a strategic location, the city grew, and with it grew the mosques for the Muslims to pray in.

Rashidunids

Abbasids

Al-Zaytuna Mosque

Khurasanid dynasty
Ksar Mosque

Hafsids
Kasbah Mosque
Al Haliq Mosque
Al Haoua Mosque
Bab Bhar Mosque
Tabbanine Mosque

Ottomans

Bab Jazira Mosque
El Jedid Mosque
Hammouda Pacha Mosque
Sabkha Mosque
Saheb Ettabaâ Mosque
Sidi Belhassen El Halfaoui Mosque
Sidi Mahrez Mosque
Soubhan Allah Mosque
Youssef Dey Mosque

Modern
El Omrane Mosque
Hajjamine Mosque

See also

List of mosques in Tunisia

Tunis
Mosques in Tunis